Kali Bianca Troy (born March 7, 1971) is an American voice actress also known as Kittie KaBoom.

Early life
She was born in Washington, D.C., U.S. She studied broadcast journalism at Clark Atlanta University. She has a degree in print journalism from the University of the District of Columbia.

Career
Ms. KaBoom has worked with Big Tigger on his syndicated radio show, Live in tha Den, as well as Spinderella on her syndicated radio program called The BackSpin. She also hosted her own weekly radio show about Voice Over called HEAR kittie kittie on Dash Radio Along with Kevin Black, President of Warner Bros. Records, and Da'Hitman on Internet radio, kittie hosted two other shows of her own, securing every major/minor radio market in the world, except for Alaska. She was the voice of Cita on BET's series Cita's World. Her live roles were as Darlene in White Men Can't Rap as Larisha in Up Against the 8-Ball and as herself on the VH1 reality show, Lets Talk About Pep.

She is known for her starring Voice over roles on the animated series, Lazor Wulf as Esther and Florence, American Dragon: Jake Long as Trixie Carter, W.I.T.C.H. as Taranee Cook and Young Justice as Rocket.

Filmography
2000 - Cita's World (music series) - Voice of Cita
2004 - Up Against the 8-Ball - Larisha
2004 - W.I.T.C.H. - Voice of Taranee Cook (Credited as Kittie)
2005 - American Dragon: Jake Long - Voice of Trixie Carter, Shaniqua Chulavista, Ms. McGuire, Courtney (credited as Miss Kittie)
2005 - Lilo & Stitch: The Series - Voice of Trixie Carter
2005 - White Men Can't Rap - Darlene
2005 - The Proud Family - (Voice)
2007 - The Boondocks (TV series) - Voice of TSA Agent, Woman Who Won't Snitch, Sweetest Taboo 
2009 - Let's Talk About Pep - Herself
2012 - Young Justice - Rocket

Additional voices (Credited as Kittie)
2009 - Let's Talk About Pep as "Kittie"

External links
 

1971 births
African-American actresses
American voice actresses
Clark Atlanta University alumni
Living people
University of the District of Columbia alumni
20th-century American actresses
21st-century American actresses
Actresses from Washington, D.C.
20th-century African-American women
20th-century African-American people
21st-century African-American women
21st-century African-American people